William Rhodes may refer to:

Sportsmen
 William Rhodes (cricketer, born 1883) (1883–1941), British cricketer
 William Rhodes (cricketer, born 1936) (1936–2005), British cricketer
 William Rhodes (footballer), soccer player
 Billy Rhodes (Welsh rugby league), Welsh rugby league footballer who played in the 1920s for Wales, Pontypridd, and Warrington
 Billy Rhodes (English rugby league), English rugby league footballer who played in the 1910s and 1920s, and coached in the 1920s through to the 1950s
 Trevor Rhodes (footballer, born 1909) (William Trevor Rhodes, 1909–1993), English footballer
 William Rhodes (American football) (1869–1914), American football player and coach
 Will Rhodes (born 1995), English cricketer

Businessmen and politicians
 William Barnard Rhodes (1807–1878), New Zealand businessman and politician (known as Barnard Rhodes)
 William C. Rhodes (New York politician), New York newspaper editor and politician
 William C. Rhodes (businessman), American businessman, CEO of AutoZone
 William R. Rhodes (born 1935), American businessman with Citigroup and Citibank
 William Rhodes (Canadian politician) (1821–1892), politician in Quebec, Canada

Others
 William Barnes Rhodes (1772–1826), English dramatist
 William Henry Rhodes (1822–1876), American writer, used the pseudonym "Caxton"
 William Rhodes (sculptor), American sculptor
 William Luther Rhodes (1918–1986), associate justice of the South Carolina Supreme Court
 William A. Rhodes (1916-2007),  inventor and astronomer of Phoenix, Arizona